It's All a Game is the second studio album by Australian musician, Jon English. The album was released in Australia November 1974. 
The album produced English's first top twenty single, a cover of Bob Seger's "Turn the Page" which entered the Kent Music chart in February 1975. The song peaked at number 7 in New Zealand.

Track listing
Vinyl/ Cassette (2907 902)
Side One
 "Turn the Page" (Bob Seger) - 4:28
 "Just the Way I Am" (Jon English) - 3:25
 "He Could Have Been a Dancer" (English) - 5:06
 "Love Goes On" (English) - 2:25
 "By Firelight" (English) - 2:38
 "Space Shanty" (English) - 3:26

Side Two	
 "Snakeyes" (English) - 5:43
 "Chained To The Middle" (English) - 5:45
 "Superstar (You Promised Me)"	(English)	- 4:50
 "Hail All Hail to the Revolution (12 Bore)" (English) - 4:36

Weekly charts

References

External links

1974 albums
Jon English albums